Wakeley is both a surname and a given name. Notable people with the name include:

Surname:
Amanda Wakeley (born 1962), British fashion designer
Cecil Wakeley (1892–1979), English surgeon
Eleazer Wakeley (1822–1912), American politician and jurist
Kitt Wakeley (born 1979), American musician
Solmous Wakeley (1794–1867), American politician

Given name:
Wakeley Gage (born 1958), English footballer
Frank Wakeley Gunsaulus (1856–1921), American educator, pastor, and humanitarian